This is a list of films set in the U.S. state of Oregon. A list of films shot in Oregon is also available.

List

See also
 Lists of Oregon-related topics

References

 
Films set in Oregon
Films set in Oregon